Santa Ines (Santa Inés or Santa Inês) may refer to one of the following places:

Places
Brazil
 Santa Inês, a city in Brazil
Chile
 Santa Inés Island, an island off the coast of southern Chile
Mexico
 Santa Inés del Monte, Oaxaca
 Santa Inés de Zaragoza, Oaxaca
 Santa Inés Yatzeche, Oaxaca
Spain
 Santa Inés, Province of Burgos, a village and municipality in Castile and León, Spain